β-Melanocyte-stimulating hormone (β-MSH) is an endogenous peptide hormone and neuropeptide. It is a melanocortin, specifically, one of the three types of melanocyte-stimulating hormone (MSH), and is produced from proopiomelanocortin (POMC). It is an agonist of the MC1, MC3, MC4, and MC5 receptors.

B-melanocyte-stimulating hormone is artificially generated because it does not exist in humans naturally.

β-MSH is also to decrease food intake in animals such as rats, chicken due to the effect of proopiomelanocortin (POMC). Research was performed to see the effect β-MSH has on chicks, and it has been found that chicks responded with a decrease in food and water intake when treated with β-MSH. The experiment showed that β-MSH causes anorexigenic effects in chicks.

See also
 α-Melanocyte-stimulating hormone
 γ-Melanocyte-stimulating hormone
 Adrenocorticotropic hormone

References

Human hormones
Melanocortin receptor agonists
Peptide hormones